Graham High School is a public high school located in Graham, Texas, United States and classified as a 4A school by the University Interscholastic League (UIL). It is part of the Graham Independent School District located in central Young County.  In 2015, the school was rated "Met Standard" by the Texas Education Agency.

Athletics
The Graham Steers compete in these sports - 

Cross Country, Volleyball, Football, Basketball, Powerlifting, Golf, Tennis, Track, Softball, Soccer & Baseball

State Titles
Boys Basketball - 
1964(3A)
Boys Golf - 
1993(3A), 2008(3A)
Girls Golf - 
1994(3A)

State Finalists
Baseball - 
1996(3A)
Boys Basketball - 
1996(3A), 2005(3A)
Football - 
2009(3A/D2)
Softball - 
1999(3A)

Notable alumni
 Mike Dowdle, former NFL player
 Sonny Gibbs, former NFL player
 Jerry Logan, former NFL player
 George Wilde, former NFL player
 Glenn Rogers, Republican member of the Texas House of Representatives from District 60 (2021-Present)

References

External links
 

Public high schools in Texas
Schools in Young County, Texas